Big Stone Lake is a long, narrow freshwater lake and reservoir on the border between western Minnesota and northeastern South Dakota in the United States.

Description
Big Stone Lake is the source of the Minnesota River, which flows  to the Mississippi River.

Flow from the lake to the Minnesota River is regulated by the Big Stone Lake Dam, built in 1937 at the lake's southern end. Although modest, the dam controls a maximum capacity of 205,000 acre-feet. It is owned and operated by the state of Minnesota.

The lake is fed by the Little Minnesota River at its north end, which flows through the Traverse Gap. Big Stone was formed at the end of the last ice age when glacial Lake Agassiz drained through the gap into Glacial River Warren. The valley of that river now holds Big Stone Lake. The lake is shown on the 1757 edition of Mitchell Map as "L. Tinton", referring to the Lakota people, also known as Tetonwan ("dwellers of the prairie"). Big Stone Lake was named for nearby rock outcroppings.

Two state parks are at the lake: Big Stone Lake State Park in Minnesota and Hartford Beach State Park in South Dakota. They provide picnic, boat launching, trail, and camping facilities. An educational center is part of the Minnesota park. Several vacation resorts are along the shores of Big Stone Lake as well. Visitors are attracted to the lake especially for its fishing: walleye, northern pike, and bluegills are all popular game fish with anglers, and the lake contains over 30 other species. There are 12 public accesses for fishing use. The lake is stocked every two years with 7,000,000 walleye fry.

The communities of Ortonville, Minnesota, and Big Stone City, South Dakota, are at the lake's southern tip; Browns Valley, Minnesota, is at the northern tip.

See also
 List of lakes in Minnesota
 List of lakes in South Dakota

References

Sources
 "Big Stone Lake". Minnesota Department of Natural Resources.  Retrieved July 29, 2005.
 "Big Stone Lake". United States Department of Transportation. Retrieved July 29, 2005. 
 Big Stone Lake Area Chamber of Commerce. Viewed July 29, 2005.
   . Environmental Protection Agency. Retrieved July 29, 2005.
 Spading, Kenton (January 2000).   . United States Army Corps of Engineers.

External links

Borders of Minnesota
Borders of South Dakota
Dams completed in 1937
Dams in Minnesota
Dams in South Dakota
Minnesota River
Reservoirs in Minnesota
Reservoirs in South Dakota
United States state-owned dams
Lakes of Big Stone County, Minnesota
Lakes of Roberts County, South Dakota
Bodies of water of Grant County, South Dakota